Clémence Castel (born 1 October 1984 Foix) is a French television personality.

She won Koh-Lanta: Pacifique, and Koh-Lanta: Le Combat des Héros.

She was a host of several television programs. She also signed with Model agencies; she was the spokesperson of the The Sims franchise.

In 2019,  she published an autobiographical book, Going to the End,  (Aller jusqu'au bout).

In 2022, she competed in Danse avec les stars.

Works 

 Aller jusqu'au bout, Flammarion, [Paris], 2019.

References 

1984 births
French television personalities
Living people
People from Foix
21st-century French women